The Yamabe problem refers to a conjecture in the mathematical field of differential geometry, which was resolved in the 1980s. It is a statement about the scalar curvature of Riemannian manifolds:

The mathematician Hidehiko Yamabe, in the paper , gave the above statements as theorems and provided a proof; however,  discovered an error in his proof. The problem of understanding whether the above statements are true or false became known as the Yamabe problem. The combined work of Yamabe, Trudinger, Thierry Aubin, and Richard Schoen provided an affirmative resolution to the problem in 1984.

It is now regarded as a classic problem in geometric analysis, with the proof requiring new methods in the fields of differential geometry and partial differential equations. A decisive point in Schoen's ultimate resolution of the problem was an application of the positive energy theorem of general relativity, which is a purely differential-geometric mathematical theorem first proved (in a provisional setting) in 1979 by Schoen and Shing-Tung Yau.

There has been more recent work due to Simon Brendle, Marcus Khuri, Fernando Codá Marques, and Schoen, dealing with the collection of all positive and smooth functions  such that, for a given Riemannian manifold , the metric  has constant scalar curvature. Additionally, the Yamabe problem as posed in similar settings, such as for complete noncompact Riemannian manifolds, is not yet fully understood.

The Yamabe problem in special cases

On a closed Einstein manifold
Let  be a smooth Riemannian manifold. Consider a positive smooth function  so that  is an arbitrary element of the smooth conformal class of  A standard computation shows
 
Taking the -inner product with  results in

If  is assumed to be Einstein, then the left-hand side vanishes. If  is assumed to be closed, then one can do an integration by parts, recalling the Bianchi identity  to see
 
If  has constant scalar curvature, then the right-hand side vanishes. The consequent vanishing of the left-hand side proves the following fact, due to Obata (1971):

Obata then went on to prove that, except in the case of the standard sphere with its usual constant-sectional-curvature metric, the only constant-scalar-curvature metrics in the conformal class of an Einstein metric (on a closed manifold) are constant multiples of the given metric. The proof proceeds by showing that the gradient of the conformal factor is actually a conformal Killing field. If the conformal factor is not constant, following flow lines of this  gradient  field, starting at a minimum of the conformal factor, then allows one to show that the manifold is conformally related to the cylinder , and hence has vanishing Weyl curvature.

The non-compact case
A closely related question is the so-called "non-compact Yamabe problem", which asks: Is it true that on every smooth complete Riemannian manifold  which is not compact, there exists a metric that is conformal to g, has constant scalar curvature and is also complete? Various additional criteria under which a solution to the Yamabe problem for a non-compact manifold can be shown to exist are known (for example ); however, obtaining a full understanding of when the problem can be solved in the non-compact case remains a topic of research.

See also
 Yamabe flow
 Yamabe invariant

References

Research articles
 

.

Textbooks
 Aubin, Thierry. Some nonlinear problems in Riemannian geometry. Springer Monographs in Mathematics. Springer-Verlag, Berlin, 1998. xviii+395 pp. 
 Schoen, R.; Yau, S.-T. Lectures on differential geometry. Lecture notes prepared by Wei Yue Ding, Kung Ching Chang [Gong Qing Zhang], Jia Qing Zhong and Yi Chao Xu. Translated from the Chinese by Ding and S. Y. Cheng. With a preface translated from the Chinese by Kaising Tso. Conference Proceedings and Lecture Notes in Geometry and Topology, I. International Press, Cambridge, MA, 1994. v+235 pp. 
 Struwe, Michael. Variational methods. Applications to nonlinear partial differential equations and Hamiltonian systems. Fourth edition. Ergebnisse der Mathematik und ihrer Grenzgebiete. 3. Folge. A Series of Modern Surveys in Mathematics [Results in Mathematics and Related Areas. 3rd Series. A Series of Modern Surveys in Mathematics], 34. Springer-Verlag, Berlin, 2008. xx+302 pp. 

Riemannian geometry
Mathematical problems